Jigger is an unincorporated community in Franklin Parish, Louisiana, United States. Jigger is located on Louisiana Highway 128, five miles (8.0 kilometers) west-southwest of Gilbert. Jigger has a U.S. Postal Service office with ZIP code 71249. The community was named after the five-year-old son's dog of the first postmaster, whose name was selected for the community by the Postal Service.

Notable people

 Rock and roll musician Allen "Puddler" Harris, past member of the bands of Ricky Nelson and Jimmie Davis, was born in Jigger in 1936.
 Perennial candidate L. D. Knox was born in Jigger in 1929.

References

Unincorporated communities in Franklin Parish, Louisiana
Unincorporated communities in Louisiana